The men's Finn competition at the 2016 Summer Olympics in Rio de Janeiro took place between 9–16 August at Marina da Glória. Eleven races (the last one a medal race) were held. British sailor Giles Scott was declared gold medallist before the competition ended, having an unassailable lead before the medal race.

Schedule

Results

Further reading

References 

 

Men's Finn
Finn competitions
Men's events at the 2016 Summer Olympics